Merrimack College is a private Augustinian university in North Andover, Massachusetts. It was founded in 1947 by the Order of St. Augustine with an initial goal to educate World War II veterans. Its campus has grown to a  campus with nearly 40 buildings housing 13 academic divisions that offer bachelor's, master's, education specialist, and doctoral degrees.

History 
Merrimack College was established in 1947 by the Order of Saint Augustine following an invitation by the Archbishop of Boston, Richard Cushing. It is the second Augustinian affiliated college in the United States after Villanova University. Church leaders saw a need to create a liberal arts college largely in a commuter school format for veterans returning from World War II. Archbishop Cushing tabbed Reverend Vincent McQuade to lead the college. McQuade was a native of Lawrence, Massachusetts and longtime friend of Archbishop Cushing. McQuade joined the effort after working on the faculty at Villanova working with veterans transitioning home from the war. McQuade organized the creation process, including land purchases and zoning, securing a charter from the state, establishing curriculum, and managing the college's campus construction. In March 1947, the Commonwealth of Massachusetts granted a charter to The Augustinian College of the Merrimack Valley in March 1947 and the college officially opened in September of the same year.

Campus 

The main campus features over 40 buildings, including a 125,000-volume library; four classroom buildings, including the Gregor Johann Mendel, O.S.A., Science, Engineering and Technology Center; the Sakowich Campus Center; the Rogers Center for the Arts; the Merrimack Athletic Complex; Austin Hall, which houses administrative offices; the Collegiate Church of Christ the Teacher; student apartment buildings and residence halls. Additionally, Merrimack owns several properties outside of the main campus, including the Louis H. Hamel Health Center and Saint Ambrose Friary (located across Elm Street from the bulk of campus), and the Engineering Innovation Center (across Route 114 from the main campus). The library is named after Rev. Vincent A. McQuade, the founder of the college. The college’s academic buildings, as well as the church and Austin Hall, are generally fronted towards Route 114, with the residence halls, athletic facilities and campus center lying further back. 

In 2017, the college received a $29.7 million tax-exempt bond from MassDevelopment. Merrimack designated several major projects for the funds, including construction of two academic buildings and three residence halls; renovations to renovate O’Reilly Hall, McQuade Library, and several other campus buildings; and upgrades to athletic facilities.

Athletics 

The athletics teams, except for ice hockey, participate in the Northeast Conference of NCAA Division I. They began their four-year transition to Division I during the 2019–20 season and will be full Division I members by 2023–24.   The college currently has 22 teams participating in intercollegiate sport (9 men's teams and 13 women's teams).  The men's and women's college ice hockey programs are currently NCAA Division I programs, participating in the Hockey East conference.

Notable alumni 
 Richard Potember - inventor and engineer
 Charlie Day - actor and comedian

References

External links

Official Website

 
Buildings and structures in North Andover, Massachusetts
Educational institutions established in 1947
Augustinian universities and colleges
Association of Catholic Colleges and Universities
Private universities and colleges in Massachusetts
Universities and colleges in Essex County, Massachusetts
Catholic universities and colleges in Massachusetts
1947 establishments in Massachusetts